Lisa Lobsinger is an indie rock singer from Calgary, Alberta, Canada. She is the lead singer for the band Reverie Sound Revue and is known for her powerful voice and distinctive hair styles. Reverie Sound Revue has released an extended play and a studio album.

Lobsinger has recorded with the bands The Summerlad and The Dudes. She is the touring frontwoman of Broken Social Scene after filling in for rotary singers Leslie Feist, Amy Millan and Emily Haines and has also lent vocals to the Shad album TSOL. Her current project is Laser, an electro-pop trio with Paul Pfisterer (of The Beauties) and Marty Kinack. Their debut album, "Night Driver" was released in January 2016.

Discography 
Featured in Had Enough of It (The Dudes, 2009)

All to All (Broken Social Scene & John McEntire, 2010)

Art House Director (Broken Social Scene & John McEntire, 2010)

Highway Slipper Jam (Broken Social Scene & John McEntire, 2010)

Featured in Lucky 1's (Shad, 2010)

Romance to the Grave (Broken Social Scene & John McEntire, 2010)

Featured in Rose Garden (Shad, 2010) 

Featured in Telephone (Shad, 2010)

Texico Bitches (Broken Social Scene, 2010) 

Featured in Intro: Lost (Shad, 2013)

Victim Lover (Broken Social Scene, 2017)

Towers and Masons (Broken Social Scene, 2017)

Featured in Erased The Night (Smalltown DJs, 2017)

Featured in Breathe (Smalltown DJs, 2021)

References 

Year of birth missing (living people)
Living people
Canadian rock guitarists
Canadian women rock singers
Canadian women guitarists
Canadian indie rock musicians
Canadian indie pop musicians
Broken Social Scene members
Musicians from Calgary
21st-century Canadian women singers